Meterana meyricci is a species of moth in the family Noctuidae. It was described and named by George Hampson in 1911 as Miselia meyricci. It is endemic to New Zealand and has been collected in and around Otago. The larvae of this species feed on Pimelea species, including Pimelea poppelwellii. Adults tend to found on the wing during the months of January to March.

References

Moths described in 1911
Moths of New Zealand
Hadeninae
Endemic fauna of New Zealand
Endemic moths of New Zealand